The Maa Sarala Temple (also known as Jhankad Sarala Temple) is a Hindu temple in the district of Jagatsinghpur, Odisha, India. It is one of the eight most famous Shakta shrines of Odisha.

In Hindu culture, 'Maa Sarala' (Mother Sarala) is a Goddess who acts as a patron of the followers of Vaishnav and Shakta. It is rare for a single deity to straddle both of these Hindu denominations. She is sometimes suspected to be a Buddhist tantric figure, as she holds a book, Veena and handbell, which are Mahayana symbols. Goddess Sarala is also known as Vak Devi, the Goddess of Knowledge and Wisdom, and Jhankad Vaasini Sharada.

Folklore regarding the goddess goes back to thousands of years, to the age of Parashurama. It is said that it was the god Parashurama who carved the goddess with the tip of his arrow. The worship of the Goddess is said to have been popularized in the 15th century CE by Sidheshwar Parida, a small-time farmer and part-time Odia Paika. He was an ardent follower of the Goddess, and later became Sarala Das, the author of the Odia Mahabharata. At many points and on many occasions he calls Goddess Sarala as Durga, Aparna, Parvati, Narayani, Bhavani, Mahalakshmi, Mahakali, Katyayani, Mahasaraswati, Chandi, Ugratara, Bhairavi, Bhagavati, Mangala, Hingula, Tripura, Vasuli, Barati, Maha Yogeswari, Tarini, Ambika, Charchika, Kamala, Parama Vaisnavi and Maheswari etc.

The current temple is approximately 500 years old, and was built by the Raja of Manijanga. The remnants of the old temple are not visible, but folklore suggests that it was sited at Badasarol, where a temple to Ganesha now stands.

Many festivals are celebrated in the temple, including Parbana, Sharadiya Utsav, Pana Sankranti, Dola Purnima, and Chandan Jatra.  The people of the Kendrapara, Jagatsinghpur and Cuttack districts are so attached to the goddess that they make it a point to visit the temple at least once per year.

Significance
The Maa Sarala temple is one of the most historically significant expressions of Shaktism. It is believed that the temple in the village of Sarala (Kanakapur) of the Jagatsinghpur district, on the eastern coast of India represents Goddess Sarala's heavenly abode. The goddess herself represents a synthesis of the divine figures of Durga and Matangi.

The sanctum sanctorum of the main temple contains three idols of the goddess. The main idol, carved out of stone, is an eight-armed figure of the goddess with her right foot on a lion, in the classic posture of Durga destroying the demon Mahishasura. She holds a sword (khadga), trident (trishul), manuscript (pustak) and lute or veena in her right hands and a disk (pattisha), bow (karmuka), bell (ghanta) and the head of the demon in her left hands. The second idol is four-armed, holding a conch shell (shankha) and a chakram, and making gestures of gift giving (varadamudra) and fearlessness (abhayamudra). The third idol is two-armed, made out of eight precious metals (ashtadhatu). The idols are taken out of the temple for different ceremonial occasions.

Temple
Historical evidence suggests that the original temple was constructed during the Bhauma-Kara in the 8th century. The Goddess Maa Sarala was worshiped in this temple till the end of Hindu rule in 1568 A.D. In 1568 AD the Supreme Commander of the Muslim army Kalapahada of Bengali Sultan Suleman Karani raided the original shrine and partly destroyed the Shakti temple. A hundred years later, during the reign of Moghul emperor Aurangzeb, the old temple was completely destroyed. The ruined temple was renovated in 1982 and is now dedicated to the worship of Lord Ganesh under the patronage of the Sarala Trust.

Some important ceremonies are still observed in the old shrine. The processional idol “Chalanti Vigraha” of Sharala is brought in a gorgeous palanquin from the present temple to the old temple seven times in a year to commemorate the ancient rituals. The idol of the deity is ceremoniously installed on the old throne where she had been worshiped for centuries. A male goat was traditionally sacrificed at the old temple in a panchayatana puja as the last ritual during the festival of Dussehra. The new year festival, Pana Sankranti, is the most important festival, when devotees dance on fire to complete their vow to the goddess.  The festival of Dol Purnima is also observed with pomp and ceremony. At this festival Goddess Sarala is worshipped along with other deities, signifying that Maa Sarala is an amalgamation of parts of the Vedic, Tantric and Vaishnavic traditions.

The present temple was constructed during the Maratha Empire, between 1753 and 1803.  In 1863 the Law Commission of India passed the Religious Endowments Act, bringing many religious establishments under the control of the government for the first time in the history of India. The Act provided for trustees selected by the local District Judge to administer the Temple. Although there were many positive provisions in the Act, a significant flaw was that trustees were appointed for life. As the Sarala Temple was inconveniently located, it quickly became neglected.

In 1928, following complaints about the mismanagement of the temple, the Cuttack District Judge nominated Ray Bahadur Chintamani Acharya and Choudhury Brajanath Mishra of Veda village as members of the Board of Trustees of the Sarala Temple. Acharya and Mishra improved the administration of the temple significantly. In particular, Acharya developed a system to allow donations of pilgrims to be used directly by the Temple, including a method for sharing donations with local hereditary administrators. He was later able to create a by-law for the temple that abolished the corrupt hereditary administration entirely. In 1939 the Orissa Hindu Religious Endowments Act came into force and the responsibility of appointing trustees was transferred from the District Judge to an Endowment Commissioner. Trustees are appointed for five-year terms.

Location and accommodation
The temple is 20 minutes by road from Jagatsinghpur district headquarters. The nearest airport is Bhubaneshwar, which is approximately 80 km away. The nearest railway station is Rahama Railway Station.  The temple is well served by buses from Cuttack. The Roads and Building (R&B) Department of the Government of Odisha maintains a facility for overnight accommodation. The Water Resources Department also maintains a rest house near the temple.

Religious history
Tantric Shaktism began in the 7th century. Shaktism holds that the mother goddess (Matrushakti) is the source of power and of highest spiritual bliss. During the early Bhaumakar rule, in 736 A.D, the eight-armed Mahinsamardini Durga appeared in the sculptural masterpieces of Odisha. Some eight-armed Mahinsamardini idols found in other parts of Odisha in the 8th century resembled the Goddess Sarala. Archaeologists and scholars have concluded that the worship of the Goddess Sarala in Jhankad began during the 8th century CE.

The worship of the goddess was popularized in the 15th century CE by the work of Sidheshwar Parida, a small-time farmer and part-time Oriya Paika. He was an ardent follower of the goddess, and later took the name Sarala Das, the servant of Maa Sarala. He became the foremost poet of Oriya literature, composing the great epics Oriya Mahabharata, Bilanka Ramayan, Chandipuran and Laxminarayan bachanika.  He attributed the composition of these works to divine inspiration by the goddess.

Tantric culture
In the Oriya Mahabharata, the Goddess Sarala was popularly known as ‘Sarola Chandi’. The worship of the goddess Sarala derives from the worship of Chandi in the Markandeya Purana. As described in the text, the goddess possesses Shiva's trident, Vishnu's Chakra, Vayu's bow, Surya's arrow, Vishwakarma's Axe. Indra's thunder, Ayiravata's bell and Himavan's Lion. Sacred verses of this text are chanted at the Shrine daily.

Tantric rituals are still in practice from time immemorial, including the daily offering of coconut water, cakes made of blackgram and different kinds of rice. Dancers also pay tribute to the goddess in the ghata nrutya. In the past, animal sacrifices were made on the occasion of Maha Ashtami, another tantric practice. The features present in the image of the goddess reflect an amalgamation of Matangi and Mahishamardini.

Attribution of entity as Saraswati
The aspect of the goddess Sarala known as Vāc devi is the eternal source of all wisdom, intelligence and inspiration. She personifies “Brahmavidya”, the mystic knowledge of the absolute. She is also known as Utkal Bharati, where Utkal signifies the state of Odisha and Bharati is one of the epithets of Saraswati and Tantrik Matangi, and Sharada, to signify that the substance of life and the power of knowledge are given by the goddess.

Legendary origin
In one legend, the goddess's origins date back to the sixth incarnation of Vishnu, Parashurama the Brahmin warrior. During his travels, Parashurama swam in the river Chandrabhaga and took a rest under a banyan tree. While meditating, he became aware of a power (Shakti) that had been hidden and desired to have self-expression. He recovered a shining stone (Parasmanisila), a form of glittering basalt, from underneath the earth and carved the divine image of the goddess with his arrow. The goddess was named Sarada, since her image was carved out by the arrow (Sara) of Parasurama.

In another legend, Sati, the original source of power and the wife of Shiva, caused herself to be sacrificed in the fireplace because she could not tolerate humiliation of her husband by her father, Daksha. Out of grief and remorse, Lord Shiva started roaming relentlessly, holding her corpse on his shoulder. Fearing that the anger of Shiva might be detrimental for mankind, Lord Vishnu sliced her body into pieces using his great weapon wheel (the Sudarshana Chakra) and scattered pieces of her body over 51 places. Around each place where a part of her body landed there grew up a sacred place of worship of the mother goddess. According to the legend, the tongue of Sati fell in Jhankada.

Festivals
Maha Visuba Pana Sankranti: Some of the rituals performed at the temple are an amalgamation of the practices of different influential sects that have been adapted in the temple over a period of time. The Maha Visuba Pana Sankranti (Jhamu Yatra), otherwise known as the “fire-walking festival” is one of the important festivals of the goddess. Sudra Sevaks belonging to the Roul caste wear picturesque costumes and dance bare-footed over burning charcoals. Some of the participants subsequently tour the nearby villages for nearly one month to spread the magnanimity of the goddess.

Durga Puja: In the autumn, the Durga Puja is observed from Mulastami to Mahastami. This is one of the greatest festivals in the Devi Peetha. Mahinsa Mardini Besa, Suna Besa and Kalika Nrutya are among the main attractions of the festival. Sodasa Upachara Puja takes place twice daily during this period. In the past, a buffalo was sacrificed on the prescribed day Mahastami (Sandhipuja), and a male goat sacrifice was performed before the ceremonial idol of the goddess on the day of Dussehra at the old shrine of the deity Sarola Grama.

Chandan Yatra'''': Chandan Yatra begins on Akshaya Tritiya and is observed for 21 days. It is a unique festival of the Shakta Shrine as the deity is worshiped here as Parama Vaishnavi. In the text of Oriya Mahabharata Sarala Thakurani is described as Parama Vaishnavi.

Nabanna Puja: The Nabanna occurs at the time of Odisha's harvesting season, in the first week of Agrahayana. Different types of foods are prepared for the deity, from the newly harvested crops and offered to the deity through Sodasa Upachara Puja.

Many of the rituals show an influence of Jagannath culture and Vasihnavism. For example, in the Gamha Avisek the processional idol of the goddess is taken nine times round the temple, similar to the tradition at the Sri Jaganath Temple Puri. In accordance with Jagannath culture, Suniya in the month of Bhadrav is observed as a coronation ceremony of the Gajapati kings.

References

External links

Hindu temples in Jagatsinghpur district